KMTJ may refer to:

 KMTJ (FM), a radio station (90.5 FM) licensed to Columbus, Montana, United States
 Montrose Regional Airport (ICAO code KMTJ)